Eves v Eves [1975] EWCA Civ 3 is an English land law case, concerning constructive trusts of the family home.

Facts
Mr Eves bought a home and kept the legal title in his name using the proceeds of his old home and a mortgage loan. His cohabiting girlfriend for what would prove  years, Janet Eves, lived there and asked why she had not been made an owner. He said it was because she was not yet 21. They had not married as Mr Eves was already married but were estranged. Janet nonetheless took his surname by deed poll in late 1968 having moved into his earlier matrimonial house.  Janet gave birth to their first child in April 1969.  "The house was very dirty and dilapidated. They went in and made their home there. She did a great deal of work to the house and garden. She did much more than many wives would do. She stripped the wallpaper in the hall. She painted woodwork in the lounge and kitchen. She painted the kitchen cabinets. She painted the brickwork in the front of the house. She broke up the concrete [with a 14 lb sledgehammer] in the front garden. She carried the pieces to a skip. She, with him, demolished a shed and put up a new shed. She prepared the front garden for turfing. To add to it all, they had their second child, a girl, on 29th December 1970."

On 19 January 1973, Janet got an order from the magistrates giving her custody of the two children and ordering Stuart Eves to pay £5 a week maintenance for each. He did not keep up those payments.

The case came before the High Court in April 1974, before the Vice Chancellor. He accepted the evidence of Janet in preference to that of Stuart Eves, but held that she was not entitled to any share in the house. She appealed.

Judgment
Lord Denning MR held Mr Eves held the house on constructive trust and Janet had a 25% share. Doing the improvement work manifested a common intention to share in the home's equity.

The other appeal judges concurred but with differing reasoning:

Browne LJ:

Brightman J:

Considered in
R v Robson (Stephen) (1990) 92 Cr App R 1; The Times, 7 August 1990, CA (E&W)

Applied in
Grant v Edwards [1986] Ch 638, CA (E&W)

See also

English land law
English property law

Notes

English land case law
1975 in case law
1975 in British law
Lord Denning cases
Court of Appeal (England and Wales) cases